Charlie Savala (born 21 April 2000) is an Australian born, Scotland qualiified rugby union player for Edinburgh Rugby in the United Rugby Championship. Savala's primary position is fly-half.

Rugby Union career

Professional career

Savala originally played Rugby league, playing for the academy of the Sydney Roosters side. 

He joined Edinburgh Rugby in October 2020. He made his debut in Round 16 of the 2020–21 Pro14 season against .

In March 2023, Savala was called up to the Scotland international squad for the final round of the Six Nations Championship.

External links
itsrugby Profile

References

2000 births
Living people
Edinburgh Rugby players
Rugby union fly-halves
Rugby union players from Sydney
Australian rugby union players